The Ansul Islands, named after the Ansul Company (now part of Tyco International), are two islands in the Menominee River and located in Marinette County, Wisconsin, United States. The islands are part of Porterfield, Wisconsin.

Notes

Landforms of Marinette County, Wisconsin
River islands of Wisconsin